The 2012 Scheldeprijs was the 100th edition of the Scheldeprijs cycle race and was held on 4 April 2012. The race was won by Marcel Kittel of the Argos–Shimano team.

General classification

References

2012
2012 in road cycling
2012 in Belgian sport